The 8th Aerobic Gymnastics World Championships were held in Sofia, Bulgaria from 3 to 5 June 2004.

Results

Women's Individual

Men's Individual

Mixed Pair

Trio

Group

Medal table

References
FIG official site
UEG European Union of Gymnastics Statistics

Aerobic Gymnastics Championships
Aerobic Gymnastics World Championships
Aerobic Gymnastics World Championships
Aerobic Gymnastics World Championships
International gymnastics competitions hosted by Bulgaria